Archibald Napier  may refer to:

 Sir Archibald Napier (landowner) (1534–1608), Scottish landowner and official, master of the Scottish mint and Laird of Merchiston
 Archibald Napier, 1st Lord Napier (c. 1576–1645)
 Archibald Napier, 2nd Lord Napier (c. 1625–1660)
 Archibald Napier, 3rd Lord Napier (died 1683)